Catarsis  (English: Catharsis) is the fourth studio album by Spanish singer Belinda, released on July 2, 2013 through Capitol Latin.

Background

Production 
In October 2011, Belinda moved to Miami, Florida to begin the process of recording the album. She created a recording studio at home which gave her the flexibility that she had not experienced before making an album. This allowed her to work at her own pace with new composers and work both lyrically and vocally. Belinda co-wrote each of the songs on the album.

Belinda worked with a close-knit group of award-winning producers and songwriters such as Victor "El Nasi", Joan Ortiz, Jorge Villamizar, Andres Castro, Lavi Beats, Lavi Hoss and Vein. The album shows a more dance-pop sound, combined with an urban flavor and lyrics with popular appeal.

Promotion 
She performed "En El Amor Hay Que Perdonar" on 2012 Premios Juventud, Kids' Choice Awards Mexico 2012, Despierta América, Hoy, and La Voz... México; "Te Voy A Esperar" at the Premios Ondas 2012 with Juan Magán; and "En La Obscuridad" at the Premios Telehit 2012, Tour Positivo and Mexico Sueña. She has made many interviews around Europe, Latin America and United States to promote the album, she also has been on a promo tour across United States, Spain and Mexico. She was again on Hoy on March 27, 2013.

Singles 
"En El Amor Hay Que Perdonar" is the official lead single, released for digital download on iTunes on June 19, 2012 in Mexico. The song was co-produced by Victor El Nasi and Joan Ortiz. A lyric music video was released on Belinda's official YouTube channel on June 16, 2012 The music video was filmed in June in Acapulco. The video was uploaded to Belinda's official VEVO channel on  August 17, 2012. The single debuted at number seven and topped the Mexican Single Charts.
"En la Obscuridad" was announced as the second single by Belinda via her Twitter account; it was released to Mexican radio on November 9, 2012. The music video premiered on Belinda's official VEVO account on February 22, 2013.
"Nada" was announced as the third single by Belinda via her Twitter account; it was released to Mexican radio on July 5, 2013.
"I Love You... Te Quiero" was announced as the fourth single by Belinda via her Twitter account; it was released globally to the radios in late January, 2014.

Other songs
"Te Voy A Esperar" (which features Juan Magán), for the soundtrack of the film Las aventuras de Tadeo Jones was digitally released in Spain, debuting and staying at number one for eleven weeks. It received  platinum certification by PROMUSICAE for sales of over 60,000 copies. In Mexico, the song was only released for airplay and peaked at number seven.
Bailaría Sobre El Fuego (Ballad version) was released on June 10, 2013 on iTunes and others digital stores as part of the promotion of the album.
Dame Más was released on September 10, 2015 as promo single in Colombia.

Tour 

The Catarsis Tour began in June 2013, in Monterrey.

Track listing

Charts and sales 
The album debuted on the Billboard Top Latin Albums at number four and at number three on the Latin Pop Albums, becoming her highest debut on the U.S. charts compared to her previous albums, selling over 1,450 copies in its first week. On the Mexican Albums Chart, the album debuted at number one, becoming her second album to top the chart.

Release history

References

External links 
 

2013 albums
Belinda Peregrín albums
Capitol Latin albums
Spanish-language albums